Andrew Caldwell may refer to:

Andrew Caldwell (actor) (born 1989), American actor
Andrew Jackson Caldwell (1837–1906), U.S. Representative from Tennessee
Drew Caldwell (born 1960), Canadian politician
Andy Caldwell, American electronic house music DJ and producer